A business organization may refer to

 Company
 Trade association
 Employer's organization